In the context of Doctor Who, Rose may refer to:

 Rose Tyler, a companion of the Doctor in the series from 2005 to 2006, played by Billie Piper
 "Rose" (Doctor Who episode), series one episode one (2005) of the relaunched Doctor Who, which introduced Rose Tyler
 Rose, a new regular Doctor Who character played by Yasmin Finney, as announced in May 2022
 Rose, dog belonging to the parallel universe version of Jackie Tyler in "Rise of the Cybermen" (series two episode five of the relaunched show, 2006)

See also
 Rosita (Doctor Who)
 Rosa (Doctor Who)